The following is a partial list of the "D" codes for Medical Subject Headings (MeSH), as defined by the United States National Library of Medicine (NLM).

This list continues the information at List of MeSH codes (D06). Codes following these are found at List of MeSH codes (D09). For other MeSH codes, see List of MeSH codes.

The source for this content is the set of 2006 MeSH Trees from the NLM.

– enzymes and coenzymes

– coenzymes

– biopterin
  – neopterin

– biotin

– cobamides

– coenzyme a
  – acyl coenzyme a
  – acetyl coenzyme a
  – malonyl coenzyme a
  – palmitoyl coenzyme a

– flavins
  – riboflavin
  – flavin-adenine dinucleotide
  – flavin mononucleotide

– nad

– nadp

– pqq cofactor

– pyridoxal phosphate

– sphingolipid activator proteins
  – g(m2) activator protein
  – saposins

– tetrahydrofolates
  – formyltetrahydrofolates
  – leucovorin

– thiamine pyrophosphate

– thioctic acid

– ubiquinone

– cytochromes

– cytochrome a group
  – cytochromes a
  – cytochromes a1
  – cytochromes a3

– cytochrome b group
  – cytochromes b
  – cytochromes b5
  – cytochromes b6

– cytochrome c group
  – cytochromes c
  – cytochromes c'
  – cytochromes c1
  – cytochromes c2
  – cytochromes c6

– cytochrome d group

– cytochrome p-450 enzyme system
  – aryl hydrocarbon hydroxylases
  – aniline hydroxylase
  – benzopyrene hydroxylase
  – cytochrome p-450 cyp1a1
  – cytochrome p-450 cyp1a2
  – cytochrome p-450 cyp2b1
  – cytochrome p-450 cyp2d6
  – cytochrome p-450 cyp2e1
  – cytochrome p-450 cyp3a
  – camphor 5-monooxygenase
  – steroid hydroxylases
  – aldosterone synthase
  – aromatase
  – cholesterol 7 alpha-hydroxylase
  – cholesterol side-chain cleavage enzyme
  – 25-hydroxyvitamin d3 1-alpha-hydroxylase
  – steroid 11-beta-hydroxylase
  – steroid 12-alpha-hydroxylase
  – steroid 16-alpha-hydroxylase
  – steroid 17-alpha-hydroxylase
  – steroid 21-hydroxylase
  – trans-cinnamate 4-monooxygenase

– cytochromes f

– enzyme precursors

– chymotrypsinogen

– complement factor B

– pepsinogens
  – pepsinogen a
  – pepsinogen c

– plasminogen
  – angiostatins

– protein c

– prothrombin

– trypsinogen

– enzymes

– dna repair enzymes
  – deoxyribodipyrimidine photo-lyase
  – dna glycosylases
  – DNA-formamidopyrimidine glycosylase
  – thymine dna glycosylase
  – uracil-dna glycosidase
  – dna ligases
  – DNA-(apurinic or apyrimidinic site) lyase
  – muts dna mismatch-binding protein
  – muts homolog 2 protein
  – polynucleotide 5'-hydroxyl-kinase

– dna restriction-modification enzymes
  – dna modification methylases
  – dna restriction enzymes
  – deoxyribonucleases, type i site-specific
  – deoxyribonucleases, type ii site-specific
  – deoxyribonuclease bamhi
  – deoxyribonuclease ecori
  – deoxyribonuclease hindiii
  – deoxyribonuclease hpaii
  – deoxyribonucleases, type iii site-specific

– dna, catalytic

– enzymes, immobilized

– holoenzymes

– hydrolases (EC 3)

– acid anhydride hydrolases  (EC 3.6)
  – adenosinetriphosphatase
  – ca(2+) mg(2+)-atpase
  – ca(2+)-transporting atpase
  – dynein atpase
  – muts dna mismatch-binding protein
  – muts homolog 2 protein
  – n-ethylmaleimide-sensitive proteins
  – proton-translocating atpases
  – bacterial proton-translocating atpases
  – chloroplast proton-translocating atpases
  – h(+)-k(+)-exchanging atpase
  – mitochondrial proton-translocating atpases
  – vacuolar proton-translocating atpases
  – kinesin
  – myosins
  – myosin type i
  – myosin type ii
  – cardiac myosins
  – atrial myosins
  – ventricular myosins
  – nonmuscle myosin type iia
  – nonmuscle myosin type iib
  – skeletal muscle myosins
  – smooth muscle myosins
  – myosin type iii
  – myosin type iv
  – myosin type v
  – na(+)-k(+)-exchanging atpase
  – apyrase
  – gtp phosphohydrolases
  – dynamins
  – dynamin i
  – dynamin ii
  – dynamin iii
  – gtp-binding proteins
  – gtp phosphohydrolase-linked elongation factors
  – peptide elongation factor g
  – peptide elongation factor tu
  – peptide elongation factor 1
  – peptide elongation factor 2
  – heterotrimeric gtp-binding proteins
  – gtp-binding protein alpha subunits
  – gtp-binding protein alpha subunits, g12-g13
  – gtp-binding protein alpha subunits, gi-go
  – gtp-binding protein alpha subunit, gi2
  – gtp-binding protein alpha subunits, gq-g11
  – gtp-binding protein alpha subunits, gs
  – transducin
  – monomeric gtp-binding proteins
  – adp-ribosylation factors
  – ADP-ribosylation factor 1
  – rab gtp-binding proteins
  – rab1 gtp-binding proteins
  – rab2 gtp-binding protein
  – rab3 gtp-binding proteins
  – rab3a gtp-binding protein
  – rab4 gtp-binding proteins
  – rab5 gtp-binding proteins
  – ral gtp-binding proteins
  – ran gtp-binding protein
  – rap gtp-binding proteins
  – rap1 gtp-binding proteins
  – ras proteins
  – oncogene protein p21(ras)
  – proto-oncogene proteins p21(ras)
  – rho gtp-binding proteins
  – cdc42 gtp-binding protein
  – cdc42 gtp-binding protein, saccharomyces cerevisiae
  – rac gtp-binding proteins
  – rac1 gtp-binding protein
  – rhoa gtp-binding protein
  – rhob gtp-binding protein
  – nucleoside-triphosphatase
  – pyrophosphatases
  – inorganic pyrophosphatase
  – thiamine pyrophosphatase
  – thiamin-triphosphatase

– adenosylhomocysteinase

– amidohydrolases
  – N-acetylmuramoyl-L-alanine amidase
  – allophanate hydrolase
  – arylformamidase
  – asparaginase
  – aspartylglucosylaminase
  – beta-lactamases
  – cephalosporinase
  – penicillinase
  – biotinidase
  – dihydroorotase
  – glutaminase
  – histone deacetylases
  – nicotinamidase
  – penicillin amidase
  – peptide-N4-(N-acetyl-beta-glucosaminyl)asparagine amidase
  – pyroglutamate hydrolase
  – sirtuins
  – urease

– aminohydrolases
  – gtp cyclohydrolase
  – guanine deaminase
  – methenyltetrahydrofolate cyclohydrolase
  – nucleoside deaminases
  – adenosine deaminase
  – cytidine deaminase
  – cytosine deaminase
  – nucleotide deaminases
  – amp deaminase
  – dcmp deaminase

– complement activating enzymes
  – complement c1r
  – complement c1s
  – complement factor d

– epoxide hydrolases

– esterases (EC 3.1)
  – carboxylic-ester hydrolases
  – acetylesterase
  – carboxylesterase
  – cholesterol esterase
  – cholinesterases
  – acetylcholinesterase
  – butyrylcholinesterase
  – pseudocholinesterase
  – dehydroascorbatase
  – lipase
  – pancrelipase
  – lipoprotein lipase
  – monoacylglycerol lipases
  – naphthol as d esterase
  – phospholipases
  – lysophospholipase
  – phospholipases a
  – 1-alkyl-2-acetylglycerophosphocholine esterase
  – deoxyribonucleases
  – endodeoxyribonucleases
  – aspergillus nuclease s1
  – deoxyribonuclease (pyrimidine dimer)
  – deoxyribonuclease i
  – streptodornase and streptokinase
  – deoxyribonuclease iv (phage t4-induced)
  – dna restriction enzymes
  – deoxyribonucleases, type i site-specific
  – deoxyribonucleases, type ii site-specific
  – deoxyribonuclease bamhi
  – deoxyribonuclease ecori
  – deoxyribonuclease hindiii
  – deoxyribonuclease hpaii
  – deoxyribonucleases, type iii site-specific
  – holliday junction resolvases
  – micrococcal nuclease
  – exodeoxyribonucleases
  – exodeoxyribonuclease V
  – endonucleases
  – endodeoxyribonucleases
  – aspergillus nuclease s1
  – dna restriction enzymes
  – deoxyribonucleases, type i site-specific
  – deoxyribonucleases, type ii site-specific
  – deoxyribonuclease bamhi
  – deoxyribonuclease ecori
  – deoxyribonuclease hindiii
  – deoxyribonuclease hpaii
  – deoxyribonucleases, type iii site-specific
  – flap endonucleases
  – holliday junction resolvases
  – micrococcal nuclease
  – endoribonucleases
  – aspergillus nuclease s1
  – micrococcal nuclease
  – ribonuclease h, calf thymus
  – ribonuclease, pancreatic
  – ribonuclease t1
  – RNA-induced silencing complex
  – exonucleases
  – exodeoxyribonucleases
  – exoribonucleases
  – phosphoric diester hydrolases
  – annexin A3
  – 3',5'-cyclic-GMP phosphodiesterase
  – 3',5'-cyclic-nucleotide phosphodiesterase
  – 2',3'-cyclic-nucleotide phosphodiesterases
  – glycerophosphoinositol inositolphosphodiesterase
  – phosphodiesterase i
  – phospholipases
  – phospholipase c
  – phosphatidylinositol diacylglycerol-lyase
  – phospholipase c gamma
  – phospholipase d
  – sphingomyelin phosphodiesterase
  – phosphoric monoester hydrolases
  – acid phosphatase
  – alkaline phosphatase
  – fructose-bisphosphatase
  – glucose-6-phosphatase
  – histidinol-phosphatase
  – 4-nitrophenylphosphatase
  – nucleotidases
  – 5'-nucleotidase
  – phosphatidate phosphatase
  – phosphofructokinase-2
  – phosphoprotein phosphatase
  – calcineurin
  – glycogen-synthase-d phosphatase
  – myosin light-chain phosphatase
  – phosphorylase phosphatase
  – protein-tyrosine-phosphatase
  – antigens, cd45
  – cdc25 phosphatase
  – pyruvate dehydrogenase (lipoamide)-phosphatase
  – 6-phytase
  – pten phosphohydrolase
  – phosphoric triester hydrolases
  – aryldialkylphosphatase
  – ribonucleases
  – endoribonucleases
  – aspergillus nuclease s1
  – eosinophil cationic protein
  – eosinophil-derived neurotoxin
  – micrococcal nuclease
  – ribonuclease h, calf thymus
  – ribonuclease iii
  – ribonuclease p
  – ribonuclease, pancreatic
  – ribonuclease t1
  – RNA-induced silencing complex
  – exoribonucleases
  – sulfatases
  – arylsulfatases
  – n-acetylgalactosamine-4-sulfatase
  – cerebroside-sulfatase
  – steryl-sulfatase
  – chondroitinases and chondroitin lyases
  – chondroitinsulfatases
  – n-acetylgalactosamine-4-sulfatase
  – chondro-4-sulfatase
  – iduronate sulfatase
  – thiolester hydrolases
  – acetyl-CoA hydrolase
  – palmitoyl-coa hydrolase
  – ubiquitin thiolesterase

– glycoside hydrolases
  – amylases
  – alpha-amylase
  – beta-amylase
  – beta-fructofuranosidase
  – chitinase
  – dextranase
  – disaccharidases
  – sucrase
  – sucrase-isomaltase complex
  – trehalase
  – alpha-L-fucosidase
  – galactosidases
  – alpha-galactosidase
  – beta-galactosidase
  – lactase
  – ceramide trihexosidase
  – galactosylceramidase
  – glucosidases
  – alpha-glucosidases
  – cellulases
  – beta-glucosidase
  – cellulase
  – cellulose 1,4-beta-cellobiosidase
  – endo-1,3(4)-beta-glucanase
  – glucan 1,3-beta-glucosidase
  – glucan 1,4-beta-glucosidase
  – glucan endo-1,3-beta-d-glucosidase
  – glucan 1,4-alpha-glucosidase
  – glycogen debranching enzyme system
  – glycosylceramidase
  – glucosylceramidase
  – glucuronidase
  – hexosaminidases
  – acetylglucosaminidase
  – alpha-N-acetylgalactosaminidase
  – Beta-N-acetylgalactosaminidase
  – Beta-N-acetylhexosaminidase
  – Mannosyl-glycoprotein endo-beta-N-acetylglucosaminidase
  – hyaluronoglucosaminidase
  – iduronidase
  – isoamylase
  – mannosidases
  – alpha-mannosidase
  – beta-mannosidase
  – muramidase
  – neuraminidase
  – n-glycosyl hydrolases
  – dna glycosylases
  – DNA-formamidopyrimidine glycosylase
  – thymine dna glycosylase
  – nad+ nucleosidase
  – adp-ribosyl cyclase
  – antigens, cd38
  – oligo-1,6-glucosidase
  – sucrase-isomaltase complex
  – polygalacturonase
  – xylosidases
  – endo-1,4-beta xylanases
  – xylan endo-1,3-beta-xylosidase

– pancreatin

– peptide hydrolases (EC 3.4)
  – atp-dependent proteases
  – endopeptidase clp
  – protease la
  – endopeptidases
  – aspartic endopeptidases
  – cathepsin d
  – cathepsin e
  – chymosin
  – HIV protease
  – pepsin a
  – renin
  – brinolase
  – cathepsins
  – carboxypeptidase c
  – cathepsin b
  – cathepsin d
  – cathepsin e
  – dipeptidyl peptidase i
  – coagulase
  – cysteine endopeptidases
  – bromelains
  – calpain
  – caspases
  – caspase 1
  – cathepsin b
  – chymopapain
  – ficain
  – papain
  – metalloendopeptidases
  – collagenases
  – gelatinase a
  – gelatinase b
  – interstitial collagenase
  – microbial collagenase
  – neutrophil collagenase
  – gelatinases
  – gelatinase a
  – gelatinase b
  – insulysin
  – lysostaphin
  – matrix metalloproteinases
  – gelatinase a
  – gelatinase b
  – interstitial collagenase
  – matrilysin
  – neutrophil collagenase
  – stromelysin 1
  – neprilysin
  – pregnancy-associated plasma protein-a
  – procollagen n-endopeptidase
  – pronase
  – thermolysin
  – serine endopeptidases
  – acrosin
  – chymotrypsin
  – complement factor b
  – complement factor d
  – complement factor i
  – endopeptidase clp
  – endopeptidase k
  – enteropeptidase
  – factor viia
  – factor ixa
  – factor xa
  – factor xia
  – factor xiia
  – furin
  – kallikreins
  – plasma kallikrein
  – prekallikrein
  – prostate-specific antigen
  – tissue kallikreins
  – mannose-binding protein-associated serine proteases
  – pancreatic elastase
  – leukocyte elastase
  – plasmin
  – plasminogen activators
  – anistreplase
  – proprotein convertase 1
  – proprotein convertase 2
  – proprotein convertase 5
  – pronase
  – protease la
  – subtilisins
  – subtilisin
  – thrombin
  – tissue plasminogen activator
  – trypsin
  – urinary plasminogen activator
  – venombin a
  – ancrod
  – batroxobin
  – streptokinase
  – anistreplase
  – streptodornase and streptokinase
  – exopeptidases
  – aminopeptidases
  – amino acid naphthylamidases
  – leucyl-beta-naphthylamidase
  – antigens, cd13
  – cystinyl aminopeptidase
  – glutamyl aminopeptidase
  – leucyl aminopeptidase
  – leucyl-beta-naphthylamidase
  – pyroglutamyl-peptidase I
  – carboxypeptidases
  – carboxypeptidases A
  – carboxypeptidase B
  – carboxypeptidase C
  – carboxypeptidase H
  – carboxypeptidase U
  – Serine-type D-Ala-D-Ala carboxypeptidase
  – gamma-glutamyl hydrolase
  – glutamate carboxypeptidase ii
  – lysine carboxypeptidase
  – muramoylpentapeptide carboxypeptidase
  – dipeptidases
  – dipeptidyl peptidases
  – antigens, cd26
  – dipeptidyl peptidase i
  – metalloexopeptidases
  – antigens, cd13
  – carboxypeptidase b
  – carboxypeptidase h
  – carboxypeptidase u
  – carboxypeptidases a
  – cystinyl aminopeptidase
  – glutamate carboxypeptidase ii
  – glutamyl aminopeptidase
  – leucyl aminopeptidase
  – leucyl-beta-naphthylamidase
  – lysine carboxypeptidase
  – peptidyl-dipeptidase a
  – metalloproteases
  – metalloendopeptidases
  – adam proteins
  – collagenases
  – gelatinase a
  – gelatinase b
  – interstitial collagenase
  – microbial collagenase
  – neutrophil collagenase
  – gelatinases
  – gelatinase a
  – gelatinase b
  – insulysin
  – lysostaphin
  – matrix metalloproteinases
  – gelatinase a
  – gelatinase b
  – interstitial collagenase
  – matrilysin
  – neutrophil collagenase
  – stromelysin 1
  – neprilysin
  – pregnancy-associated plasma protein-a
  – procollagen n-endopeptidase
  – pronase
  – thermolysin
  – metalloexopeptidases
  – antigens, cd13
  – carboxypeptidase b
  – carboxypeptidase h
  – carboxypeptidase u
  – carboxypeptidases a
  – cystinyl aminopeptidase
  – glutamate carboxypeptidase ii
  – glutamyl aminopeptidase
  – leucyl aminopeptidase
  – leucyl-beta-naphthylamidase
  – lysine carboxypeptidase
  – proprotein convertases
  – carboxypeptidase h
  – carboxypeptidase u
  – furin
  – proprotein convertase 1
  – proprotein convertase 2
  – proprotein convertase 5
  – renin
  – proteasome endopeptidase complex

– ureohydrolases
  – arginase

– isoenzymes

– isomerases (EC 5)

– cis-trans-isomerases (EC 5.2)
  – peptidylprolyl isomerase
  – immunophilins
  – cyclophilins
  – cyclophilin A
  – tacrolimus binding proteins
  – tacrolimus binding protein 1a

– dna helicases
  – xeroderma pigmentosum group d protein

– dna topoisomerases
  – dna topoisomerases, type i
  – dna topoisomerases, type i, archaeal
  – dna topoisomerases, type i, bacterial
  – dna topoisomerases, type i, eukaryotic
  – dna topoisomerases, type ii
  – dna topoisomerases, type ii, archaeal
  – dna topoisomerases, type ii, bacterial
  – dna gyrase
  – dna topoisomerase iv
  – dna topoisomerases, type ii, eukaryotic

– intramolecular lyases (EC 5.5)
  – myo-inositol-1-phosphate synthase

– intramolecular oxidoreductases (EC 5.3)
  – aldose-ketose isomerases
  – autocrine motility factor
  – glucose-6-phosphate isomerase
  – mannose-6-phosphate isomerase
  – neuroleukin
  – triose-phosphate isomerase
  – carbon-carbon double bond isomerases
  – steroid isomerases
  – sulfur-sulfur bond isomerases
  – protein disulfide-isomerase
  – thromboxane-a synthase

– intramolecular transferases (EC 5.4)
  – 2-acetolactate mutase
  – chorismate mutase
  – prephenate dehydratase
  – prephenate dehydrogenase
  – methylmalonyl-coa mutase
  – phosphotransferases (phosphomutases)
  – bisphosphoglycerate mutase
  – phosphoglucomutase
  – phosphoglycerate mutase

– racemases and epimerases (EC 5.1)
  – amino acid isomerases
  – alanine racemase
  – carbohydrate epimerases
  – UDP-glucose 4-epimerase

– ligases (EC 6)

– carbon-carbon ligases (EC 6.4)
  – acetyl-coa carboxylase
  – polyketide synthases
  – pyruvate carboxylase

– carbon-nitrogen ligases (EC 6.3)
  – adenylosuccinate synthase
  – amide synthases
  – aspartate-ammonia ligase
  – glutamate-ammonia ligase
  – argininosuccinate synthase
  – carbamoyl-phosphate synthase (ammonia)
  – carbon-nitrogen ligases with glutamine as amide-n-donor
  – carbamoyl-phosphate synthase (glutamine-hydrolyzing)
  – formate-tetrahydrofolate ligase
  – peptide synthases
  – glutamate-cysteine ligase
  – glutathione synthase

– carbon-oxygen ligases (EC 6.1)
  – amino acyl-trna synthetases
  – alanine—tRNA ligase
  – arginine—tRNA ligase
  – aspartate—tRNA ligase
  – glutamate-trna ligase
  – glycine-trna ligase
  – histidine-trna ligase
  – isoleucine-trna ligase
  – leucine-trna ligase
  – lysine-trna ligase
  – methionine-trna ligase
  – phenylalanine-trna ligase
  – serine-trna ligase
  – threonine—tRNA ligase
  – tryptophan—tRNA ligase
  – tyrosine—tRNA ligase
  – valine—tRNA ligase

– carbon-sulfur ligases (EC 6.2)
  – coenzyme a ligases
  – acetate-coa ligase
  – succinate-coa ligases

– polynucleotide ligases
  – dna ligases
  – rna ligase (atp)

– ubiquitin-protein ligase complexes
  – Ubiquitin-activating enzyme
  – ubiquitin-conjugating enzymes
  – ubiquitin-protein ligases
  – fanconi anemia complementation group l protein
  – proto-oncogene proteins c-cbl
  – proto-oncogene proteins c-mdm2
  – skp cullin f-box protein ligases
  – cullin proteins
  – von hippel-lindau tumor suppressor protein

– lyases (EC 4)

– carbon-carbon lyases (EC 4.1)
  – aldehyde lyases
  – 2-dehydro-3-deoxyphosphoheptonate aldolase
  – fructose-bisphosphate aldolase
  – carboxy-lyases
  – adenosylmethionine decarboxylase
  – aromatic-L-amino-acid decarboxylase
  – dopa decarboxylase
  – glutamate decarboxylase
  – histidine decarboxylase
  – indole-3-glycerol-phosphate synthase
  – methylmalonyl-coa decarboxylase
  – ornithine decarboxylase
  – orotidine-5'-phosphate decarboxylase
  – phosphoenolpyruvate carboxykinase (atp)
  – phosphoenolpyruvate carboxykinase (gtp)
  – phosphoenolpyruvate carboxylase
  – pyruvate decarboxylase
  – ribulose-bisphosphate carboxylase
  – tyrosine decarboxylase
  – uroporphyrinogen decarboxylase
  – deoxyribodipyrimidine photo-lyase
  – oxo-acid-lyases
  – anthranilate synthase
  – isocitrate lyase
  – tryptophanase
  – tyrosine phenol-lyase

– carbon-nitrogen lyases (EC 4.3)
  – amidine-lyases
  – adenylosuccinate lyase
  – argininosuccinate lyase
  – delta-crystallins
  – ammonia-lyases
  – aspartate ammonia-lyase
  – ethanolamine ammonia-lyase
  – histidine ammonia-lyase
  – l-serine dehydratase
  – phenylalanine ammonia-lyase
  – threonine dehydratase

– carbon-oxygen lyases (EC 4.2)
  – DNA-(apurinic or apyrimidinic site) lyase
  – hydro-lyases
  – aconitate hydratase
  – iron regulatory protein 1
  – iron regulatory protein 2
  – carbonic anhydrases
  – carbonic anhydrase i
  – carbonic anhydrase ii
  – carbonic anhydrase iii
  – carbonic anhydrase iv
  – carbonic anhydrase v
  – cystathionine beta-synthase
  – enoyl-coa hydratase
  – fumarate hydratase
  – phosphopyruvate hydratase
  – tau-crystallins
  – porphobilinogen synthase
  – prephenate dehydratase
  – propanediol dehydratase
  – tryptophan synthase
  – urocanate hydratase
  – uroporphyrinogen iii synthetase
  – polysaccharide-lyases
  – chondroitinases and chondroitin lyases
  – chondroitin lyases
  – chondroitin abc lyase
  – heparin lyase
  – hyaluronoglucosaminidase

– carbon-sulfur lyases (EC 4.4)
  – cystathionine gamma-lyase
  – lactoylglutathione lyase

– ferrochelatase

– phosphorus-oxygen lyases (EC 4.6)
  – adenylate cyclase
  – adenylate cyclase toxin
  – guanylate cyclase
  – receptors, guanylate cyclase-coupled
  – receptors, atrial natriuretic factor
  – phosphatidylinositol diacylglycerol-lyase

– multienzyme complexes
  – anthranilate phosphoribosyltransferase
  – anthranilate synthase
  – aspartate carbamoyltransferase
  – aspartokinase homoserine dehydrogenase
  – cholesterol side-chain cleavage enzyme
  – electron transport chain complex proteins
  – electron-transferring flavoproteins
  – electron transport complex i
  – electron transport complex ii
  – succinate dehydrogenase
  – electron transport complex iv
  – succinate cytochrome c oxidoreductase
  – electron transport complex ii
  – succinate dehydrogenase
  – electron transport complex iii
  – fatty acid synthetase complex
  – glycine decarboxylase complex
  – aminomethyltransferase
  – dihydrolipoamide dehydrogenase
  – glycine decarboxylase complex h-protein
  – glycine dehydrogenase (decarboxylating)
  – ketoglutarate dehydrogenase complex
  – dihydrolipoamide dehydrogenase
  – lactose synthase
  – phosphoenolpyruvate sugar phosphotransferase system
  – photosynthetic reaction center complex proteins
  – light-harvesting protein complexes
  – cytochrome b6f complex
  – cytochromes b6
  – cytochromes f
  – plastoquinol-plastocyanin reductase
  – photosystem i protein complex
  – photosystem ii protein complex
  – polyketide synthases
  – prostaglandin-endoperoxide synthases
  – cyclooxygenase 1
  – cyclooxygenase 2
  – proteasome endopeptidase complex
  – pyruvate dehydrogenase complex
  – dihydrolipoamide dehydrogenase
  – dihydrolipoyllysine-residue acetyltransferase
  – pyruvate dehydrogenase (lipoamide)
  – sucrase-isomaltase complex
  – tryptophan synthase

– oxidoreductases (EC 1)

– alcohol oxidoreductases
  – acetoin dehydrogenase
  – alcohol dehydrogenase
  – carbohydrate dehydrogenases
  – fructuronate reductase
  – galactose dehydrogenases
  – glucose dehydrogenases
  – glucose 1-dehydrogenase
  – glucosephosphate dehydrogenase
  – phosphogluconate dehydrogenase
  – phosphoglycerate dehydrogenase
  – sugar alcohol dehydrogenases
  – aldehyde reductase
  – d-xylulose reductase
  – glycerolphosphate dehydrogenase
  – glycerol-3-phosphate dehydrogenase (nad+)
  – l-gulonolactone oxidase
  – l-iditol 2-dehydrogenase
  – mannitol dehydrogenase
  – uridine diphosphate glucose dehydrogenase
  – choline dehydrogenase
  – galactose oxidase
  – glucose oxidase
  – homoserine dehydrogenase
  – aspartokinase homoserine dehydrogenase
  – 3-hydroxyacyl coa dehydrogenases
  – hydroxymethylglutaryl coa reductases
  – hydroxymethylglutaryl-coa reductases, nad-dependent
  – hydroxymethylglutaryl-coa-reductases, nadp-dependent
  – hydroxybutyrate dehydrogenase
  – Hydroxyprostaglandin dehydrogenase
  – hydroxypyruvate reductase
  – hydroxysteroid dehydrogenases
  – 11-beta-hydroxysteroid dehydrogenases
  – 11-beta-hydroxysteroid dehydrogenase type 1
  – 11-beta-hydroxysteroid dehydrogenase type 2
  – 3-hydroxysteroid dehydrogenases
  – 3alpha-hydroxysteroid dehydrogenase (B-specific)
  – cholesterol oxidase
  – progesterone reductase
  – 17-hydroxysteroid dehydrogenases
  – estradiol dehydrogenases
  – 20-hydroxysteroid dehydrogenases
  – 20alpha-hydroxysteroid dehydrogenase
  – cortisone reductase
  – imp dehydrogenase
  – isocitrate dehydrogenase
  – 3-isopropylmalate dehydrogenase
  – ketol-acid reductoisomerase
  – lactate dehydrogenases
  – epsilon-crystallins
  – l-lactate dehydrogenase
  – l-lactate dehydrogenase (cytochrome)
  – malate dehydrogenase
  – malate dehydrogenase (nadp+)
  – xanthine dehydrogenase
  – xanthine oxidase

– ascorbate oxidase

– ceruloplasmin

– electron transport complex iv

– hydrogenase

– laccase

– luciferases

– 5,10-methylenetetrahydrofolate reductase (fadh2)

– nadh, nadph oxidoreductases
  – apoptosis inducing factor
  – cytochrome reductases
  – cytochrome-b(5) reductase
  – nadph-ferrihemoprotein reductase
  – electron transport complex i
  – nadh dehydrogenase
  – nadh tetrazolium reductase
  – nadp transhydrogenase
  – nadph dehydrogenase
  – nadph oxidase
  – quinone reductases
  – nad(p)h dehydrogenase (quinone)
  – zeta-crystallins

– nitrogenase
  – dinitrogenase reductase
  – molybdoferredoxin

– nitroreductases
  – gmp reductase
  – nitrate reductases
  – nitrate reductase
  – nitrate reductase (nadh)
  – nitrate reductase (nad(p)h)
  – nitrate reductase (nadph)
  – nitrite reductases
  – ferredoxin-nitrite reductase
  – nitrite reductase (NAD(P)H)

– oxidoreductases acting on aldehyde or oxo group donors
  – aldehyde oxidoreductases
  – aldehyde dehydrogenase
  – omega-crystallins
  – aldehyde oxidase
  – aminomuconate-semialdehyde dehydrogenase
  – aspartate-semialdehyde dehydrogenase
  – benzaldehyde dehydrogenase (NADP+)
  – betaine-aldehyde dehydrogenase
  – glutamate-5-semialdehyde dehydrogenase
  – glyceraldehyde-3-phosphate dehydrogenases
  – glyceraldehyde 3-phosphate dehydrogenase (nadp+)
  – glyceraldehyde-3-phosphate dehydrogenase (nadp+)(phosphorylating)
  – glyceraldehyde-3-phosphate dehydrogenase (phosphorylating)
  – glycolaldehyde dehydrogenase
  – l-aminoadipate-semialdehyde dehydrogenase
  – malonate-semialdehyde dehydrogenase (acetylating)
  – methylmalonate-semialdehyde dehydrogenase (acylating)
  – retinal dehydrogenase
  – succinate-semialdehyde dehydrogenase
  – succinate-semialdehyde dehydrogenase (NAD(P)+)
  – formate dehydrogenases
  – ketone oxidoreductases
  – ketoglutarate dehydrogenase complex
  – dihydrolipoamide dehydrogenase
  – 3-methyl-2-oxobutanoate dehydrogenase (lipoamide)
  – 2-oxoisovalerate dehydrogenase (acylating)
  – pyruvate dehydrogenase (lipoamide)
  – pyruvate oxidase
  – pyruvate synthase

– oxidoreductases acting on ch-ch group donors
  – acyl-coa dehydrogenases
  – acyl-coa dehydrogenase
  – acyl-coa dehydrogenase, long-chain
  – acyl-CoA oxidase
  – butyryl-coa dehydrogenase
  – cholestenone 5alpha-reductase
  – coproporphyrinogen oxidase
  – dihydrodipicolinate reductase
  – dihydroorotate oxidase
  – dihydrouracil dehydrogenase (nad+)
  – dihydrouracil dehydrogenase (nadp)
  – electron transport complex ii
  – succinate dehydrogenase
  – enoyl-(acyl-carrier-protein) reductase (nadh)
  – enoyl-(acyl-carrier protein) reductase (nadph, b-specific)
  – Glutaryl-CoA dehydrogenase
  – isovaleryl-coa dehydrogenase
  – 15-oxoprostaglandin 13-reductase
  – prephenate dehydrogenase
  – protoporphyrinogen oxidase
  – succinate dehydrogenase
  – testosterone 5-alpha-Reductase

– oxidoreductases acting on ch-nh group donors
  – dihydropteridine reductase
  – FMN reductase
  – methylenetetrahydrofolate dehydrogenase (nad+)
  – methylenetetrahydrofolate dehydrogenase (nadp)
  – methylenetetrahydrofolate reductase (nadph2)
  – oxidoreductases, n-demethylating
  – aminopyrine n-demethylase
  – cytochrome p-450 cyp2e1
  – cytochrome p-450 cyp3a
  – dihydropteridine reductase
  – dimethylglycine dehydrogenase
  – ethylmorphine-n-demethylase
  – sarcosine dehydrogenase
  – sarcosine oxidase
  – proline oxidase
  – pyridoxamine-phosphate oxidase
  – 1-pyrroline-5-carboxylate dehydrogenase
  – pyrroline carboxylate reductases
  – saccharopine dehydrogenases
  – tetrahydrofolate dehydrogenase

– oxidoreductases acting on ch-nh2 group donors
  – amine oxidase (copper-containing)
  – amino acid oxidoreductases
  – alanine dehydrogenase
  – d-amino-acid oxidase
  – d-aspartate oxidase
  – glutamate dehydrogenase
  – glutamate dehydrogenase (nadp+)
  – glutamate synthase (NADPH)
  – glutamate synthase (NADH)
  – glycine decarboxylase complex
  – glycine dehydrogenase (decarboxylating)
  – glycine dehydrogenase
  – l-amino acid oxidase
  – leucine dehydrogenase
  – nitric oxide synthase
  – nitric oxide synthase type i
  – nitric oxide synthase type ii
  – nitric oxide synthase type iii
  – proline oxidase
  – protein-lysine 6-oxidase
  – valine dehydrogenase (NADP+)
  – monoamine oxidase
  – benzylamine oxidase

– oxidoreductases acting on sulfur group donors
  – dihydrolipoamide dehydrogenase
  – ferredoxin-nadp reductase
  – glutathione reductase
  – hydrogensulfite reductase
  – protein-disulfide reductase (glutathione)
  – sulfite dehydrogenase
  – sulfite oxidase
  – sulfite reductase (ferredoxin)
  – sulfite reductase (nadph)
  – thioredoxin reductase (nadph)

– oxidoreductases, o-demethylating
  – nitroanisole o-demethylase

– oxygenases
  – dioxygenases
  – catechol 1,2-dioxygenase
  – catechol 2,3-dioxygenase
  – cysteine dioxygenase
  – homogentisate 1,2-dioxygenase
  – 3-hydroxyanthranilate 3,4-dioxygenase
  – 4-hydroxyphenylpyruvate dioxygenase
  – indoleamine-pyrrole 2,3-dioxygenase
  – lipoxygenase
  – arachidonate lipoxygenases
  – arachidonate 5-lipoxygenase
  – arachidonate 12-lipoxygenase
  – arachidonate 15-lipoxygenase
  – protocatechuate 3,4-dioxygenase
  – tryptophan oxygenase
  – inositol oxygenase
  – mixed function oxygenases
  – benzoate 4-monooxygenase
  – catechol oxidase
  – monophenol monooxygenase
  – cytochrome p-450 enzyme system
  – aryl hydrocarbon hydroxylases
  – 7-alkoxycoumarin o-dealkylase
  – aniline hydroxylase
  – benzopyrene hydroxylase
  – cytochrome p-450 cyp1a1
  – cytochrome p-450 cyp1a2
  – cytochrome p-450 cyp2b1
  – cytochrome p-450 cyp2d6
  – cytochrome p-450 cyp2e1
  – cytochrome p-450 cyp3a
  – camphor 5-monooxygenase
  – alkane 1-monooxygenase
  – steroid hydroxylases
  – aldosterone synthase
  – aromatase
  – cholesterol 7 alpha-hydroxylase
  – cholesterol side-chain cleavage enzyme
  – 25-hydroxyvitamin d3 1-alpha-hydroxylase
  – steroid 11-beta-hydroxylase
  – steroid 12-alpha-hydroxylase
  – steroid 16-alpha-hydroxylase
  – steroid 17-alpha-hydroxylase
  – steroid 21-hydroxylase
  – dopamine beta-hydroxylase
  – fatty acid desaturases
  – beta-carotene 15,15'-monooxygenase
  – Linoleoyl-CoA desaturase
  – stearoyl-coa desaturase
  – gamma-butyrobetaine dioxygenase
  – heme oxygenase (decyclizing)
  – heme oxygenase-1
  – 4-hydroxybenzoate 3-monooxygenase
  – kynurenine 3-monooxygenase
  – phenylalanine hydroxylase
  – procollagen-lysine, 2-oxoglutarate 5-dioxygenase
  – procollagen-proline dioxygenase
  – prostaglandin-endoperoxide synthases
  – squalene monooxygenase
  – steroid hydroxylases
  – aldosterone synthase
  – aromatase
  – cholesterol 7 alpha-hydroxylase
  – cholesterol side-chain cleavage enzyme
  – 25-hydroxyvitamin d3 1-alpha-hydroxylase
  – steroid 11-beta-hydroxylase
  – steroid 12-alpha-hydroxylase
  – steroid 16-alpha-hydroxylase
  – steroid 17-alpha-hydroxylase
  – steroid 21-hydroxylase
  – trans-cinnamate 4-monooxygenase
  – tryptophan hydroxylase
  – tyrosine 3-monooxygenase

– peroxidases
  – catalase
  – chloride peroxidase
  – cytochrome-c peroxidase
  – eosinophil peroxidase
  – glutathione peroxidase
  – horseradish peroxidase
  – wheat germ agglutinin-horseradish peroxidase conjugate
  – iodide peroxidase
  – lactoperoxidase
  – peroxidase

– plastoquinol-plastocyanin reductase

– ribonucleotide reductases
  – ribonucleoside diphosphate reductase

– selenoprotein r

– succinate cytochrome c oxidoreductase
  – electron transport complex ii
  – succinate dehydrogenase
  – electron transport complex iii

– superoxide dismutase

– urate oxidase

– penicillin-binding proteins

– recombinases
  – holliday junction resolvases
  – integrases
  – transposases
  – hiv integrase
  – rec a recombinases
  – rad51 recombinase
  – transposon resolvases
  – vdj recombinases

– rna, catalytic
  – ribonuclease p
  – rna, ribosomal, self-splicing

– transferases (EC 2)

– acyltransferases (EC 2.3)
  – acetyl-CoA C-acyltransferase
  – acetyltransferases
  – acyl-carrier protein s-acetyltransferase
  – acetyl-CoA C-acetyltransferase
  – amino-acid n-acetyltransferase
  – carnitine O-acetyltransferase
  – chloramphenicol o-acetyltransferase
  – choline o-acetyltransferase
  – dihydrolipoyllysine-residue acetyltransferase
  – glucosamine 6-phosphate n-acetyltransferase
  – histone acetyltransferases
  – p300-CBP coactivator family
  – creb-binding protein
  – e1a-associated p300 protein
  – phosphate acetyltransferase
  – serine O-acetyltransferase
  – acyl-carrier protein s-malonyltransferase
  – 1-acylglycerol-3-phosphate O-acyltransferase
  – 1-acylglycerophosphocholine O-acyltransferase
  – aminoacyltransferases
  – gamma-glutamylcyclotransferase
  – gamma-glutamyltransferase
  – peptidyl transferases
  – transglutaminases
  – factor xiiia
  – 5-aminolevulinate synthetase
  – arylalkylamine n-acetyltransferase
  – arylamine N-acetyltransferase
  – atp citrate (pro-s)-lyase
  – carnitine acyltransferases
  – carnitine O-acetyltransferase
  – carnitine o-palmitoyltransferase
  – citrate (Si)-synthase
  – diacylglycerol o-acyltransferase
  – glycerol-3-phosphate O-acyltransferase
  – homoserine O-succinyltransferase
  – hydroxymethylglutaryl-CoA synthase
  – 2-isopropylmalate synthase
  – malate synthase
  – 3-oxoacyl-(acyl-carrier-protein) synthase
  – phosphatidylcholine-sterol O-acyltransferase
  – retinol O-fatty-acyltransferase
  – serine C-palmitoyltransferase
  – sphingosine N-acyltransferase
  – sterol O-acyltransferase

– aldehyde-ketone transferases (EC 2.2)
  – acetolactate synthase
  – transaldolase
  – transketolase

– alkyl and aryl transferases (EC 2.5)
  – cysteine synthase
  – dihydropteroate synthase
  – dimethylallyltranstransferase
  – farnesyl-diphosphate farnesyltransferase
  – farnesyltranstransferase
  – geranylgeranyl-diphosphate geranylgeranyltransferase
  – geranyltranstransferase
  – glutathione transferase
  – glutathione S-transferase pi
  – hydroxymethylbilane synthase
  – methionine adenosyltransferase
  – 3-phosphoshikimate 1-carboxyvinyltransferase
  – riboflavin synthase
  – spermidine synthase
  – spermine synthase

– glycosyltransferases (EC 2.4)
  – n-acetylhexosaminyltransferases
  – n-acetylgalactosaminyltransferases
  – fucosyl galactose alpha-n-acetylgalactosaminyltransferase
  – n-acetylglucosaminyltransferases
  – hexosyltransferases
  – fucosyltransferases
  – galactosyltransferases
  – n-acylsphingosine galactosyltransferase
  – beta-n-acetylglucosaminylglycopeptide beta-1,4-galactosyltransferase
  – ganglioside galactosyltransferase
  – lactose synthase
  – n-acetyllactosamine synthase
  – glucosyltransferases
  – 1,4-alpha-glucan branching enzyme
  – chitin synthase
  – glycogen debranching enzyme system
  – glycogen synthase
  – phosphorylases
  – glycogen phosphorylase
  – glycogen phosphorylase, brain form
  – glycogen phosphorylase, liver form
  – glycogen phosphorylase, muscle form
  – phosphorylase a
  – phosphorylase b
  – starch phosphorylase
  – starch synthase
  – glucuronosyltransferase
  – mannosyltransferases
  – peptidoglycan glycosyltransferase
  – pentosyltransferases
  – adenine phosphoribosyltransferase
  – adp ribose transferases
  – cholera toxin
  – diphtheria toxin
  – nad+ nucleosidase
  – adp-ribosyl cyclase
  – pertussis toxin
  – poly(adp-ribose) polymerases
  – tankyrases
  – sirtuins
  – amidophosphoribosyltransferase
  – anthranilate phosphoribosyltransferase
  – ATP phosphoribosyltransferase
  – hypoxanthine phosphoribosyltransferase
  – orotate phosphoribosyltransferase
  – purine-nucleoside phosphorylase
  – thymidine phosphorylase
  – uridine phosphorylase
  – sialyltransferases

– nitrogenous group transferases (EC 2.6)
  – transaminases
  – alanine transaminase
  – 2-aminoadipate transaminase
  – 4-aminobutyrate transaminase
  – aspartate aminotransferases
  – aspartate aminotransferase, cytoplasmic
  – aspartate aminotransferase, mitochondrial
  – beta-alanine-pyruvate transaminase
  – d-alanine transaminase
  – Glutamate synthase (ferredoxin)
  – glutamine-fructose-6-phosphate transaminase (isomerizing)
  – glycine transaminase
  – leucine transaminase
  – l-lysine 6-transaminase
  – ornithine-oxo-acid transaminase
  – succinyldiaminopimelate transaminase
  – tryptophan transaminase
  – tyrosine transaminase

– one-carbon group transferases (EC 2.1)
  – amidinotransferases
  – carboxyl and carbamoyl transferases
  – aspartate carbamoyltransferase
  – ornithine carbamoyltransferase
  – hydroxymethyl and formyl transferases
  – aminomethyltransferase
  – glutamate formimidoyltransferase
  – glycine hydroxymethyltransferase
  – phosphoribosylaminoimidazolecarboxamide formyltransferase
  – phosphoribosylglycinamide formyltransferase
  – methyltransferases
  – acetylserotonin n-methyltransferase
  – betaine-homocysteine S-methyltransferase
  – catechol O-methyltransferase
  – dna modification methylases
  – dna (cytosine-5-)-methyltransferase
  – site-specific dna-methyltransferase (adenine-specific)
  – site-specific dna methyltransferase (cytosine-specific)
  – glycine N-methyltransferase
  – guanidinoacetate N-methyltransferase
  – histamine N-methyltransferase
  – homocysteine S-methyltransferase
  – 5-methyltetrahydrofolate-homocysteine s-methyltransferase
  – nicotinamide N-methyltransferase
  – phenylethanolamine N-methyltransferase
  – phosphatidyl-N-methylethanolamine N-methyltransferase
  – phosphatidylethanolamine N-methyltransferase
  – protein methyltransferases
  – histone-lysine n-methyltransferase
  – o-6-methylguanine-DNA methyltransferase
  – protein-arginine n-methyltransferase
  – protein o-methyltransferase
  – protein d-aspartate-l-isoaspartate methyltransferase
  – thymidylate synthase
  – trna methyltransferases

– phosphotransferases (EC 2.7)
  – diphosphotransferases
  – gtp pyrophosphokinase
  – ribose-phosphate pyrophosphokinase
  – thiamin pyrophosphokinase
  – myosin type iii
  – nucleotidyltransferases
  – n-acylneuraminate cytidylyltransferase
  – choline-phosphate cytidylyltransferase
  – dna nucleotidyltransferases
  – dna-directed dna polymerase
  – dna polymerase beta
  – dna polymerase i
  – dna polymerase ii
  – dna polymerase iii
  – RNA-directed dna polymerase
  – hiv-1 reverse transcriptase
  – telomerase
  – taq polymerase
  – dna nucleotidylexotransferase
  – glucose-1-phosphate adenylyltransferase
  – nicotinamide-nucleotide adenylyltransferase
  – 2',5'-oligoadenylate synthetase
  – polynucleotide adenylyltransferase
  – rec a recombinases
  – rna nucleotidyltransferases
  – dna, catalytic
  – dna-directed rna polymerases
  – dna primase
  – rna polymerase i
  – rna polymerase ii
  – rna polymerase iii
  – rna polymerase sigma 54
  – polyribonucleotide nucleotidyltransferase
  – q beta replicase
  – rna helicases
  – eukaryotic initiation factor-4a
  – rna replicase
  – rna, ribosomal, self-splicing
  – sulfate adenylyltransferase
  – transposases
  – hiv integrase
  – transposon resolvases
  – UDP-glucose—hexose-1-phosphate uridylyltransferase
  – UTP—glucose-1-phosphate uridylyltransferase
  – UTP—hexose-1-phosphate uridylyltransferase
  – vdj recombinases
  – phosphotransferases (alcohol group acceptor)
  – adenosine kinase
  – choline kinase
  – deoxycytidine kinase
  – diacylglycerol kinase
  – fructokinases
  – phosphofructokinases
  – phosphofructokinase-1
  – phosphofructokinase-1, liver type
  – phosphofructokinase-1, muscle type
  – phosphofructokinase-1, type c
  – phosphofructokinase-2
  – galactokinase
  – glucokinase
  – glycerol kinase
  – hexokinase
  – kanamycin kinase
  – 1-phosphatidylinositol 3-kinase
  – 1-phosphatidylinositol 4-kinase
  – phosphoenolpyruvate sugar phosphotransferase system
  – polynucleotide 5'-hydroxyl-kinase
  – protein kinases
  – phosphorylase kinase
  – protein-serine-threonine kinases
  – activin receptors
  – activin receptors, type i
  – activin receptors, type ii
  – bone morphogenetic protein receptors
  – bone morphogenetic protein receptors, type i
  – bone morphogenetic protein receptors, type ii
  – ca(2+)-calmodulin dependent protein kinase
  – myosin-light-chain kinase
  – casein kinases
  – casein kinase i
  – casein kinase ialpha
  – casein kinase idelta
  – casein kinase iepsilon
  – casein kinase ii
  – cyclic nucleotide-regulated protein kinases
  – cyclic amp-dependent protein kinases
  – beta-adrenergic-receptor kinase
  – cyclic gmp-dependent protein kinases
  – protamine kinase
  – cyclin-dependent kinases
  – cdc2-cdc28 kinases
  – cdc2 protein kinase
  – cdc28 protein kinase, s cerevisiae
  – cyclin-dependent kinase 5
  – cyclin-dependent kinase 9
  – cyclin-dependent kinase 2
  – cyclin-dependent kinase 4
  – cyclin-dependent kinase 6
  – maturation-promoting factor
  – cdc2 protein kinase
  – dna-activated protein kinase
  – eif-2 kinase
  – glycogen synthase kinases
  – glycogen synthase kinase 3
  – i-kappa B kinase
  – map kinase kinase kinases
  – map kinase kinase kinase 1
  – map kinase kinase kinase 2
  – map kinase kinase kinase 3
  – map kinase kinase kinase 4
  – map kinase kinase kinase 5
  – proto-oncogene proteins c-mos
  – raf kinases
  – oncogene proteins v-raf
  – proto-oncogene proteins b-raf
  – proto-oncogene proteins c-raf
  – mitogen-activated protein kinase kinases
  – map kinase kinase 1
  – map kinase kinase 2
  – map kinase kinase 3
  – map kinase kinase 4
  – map kinase kinase 5
  – map kinase kinase 6
  – map kinase kinase 7
  – mitogen-activated protein kinases
  – extracellular signal-regulated map kinases
  – mitogen-activated protein kinase 1
  – mitogen-activated protein kinase 3
  – mitogen-activated protein kinase 6
  – mitogen-activated protein kinase 7
  – jnk mitogen-activated protein kinases
  – mitogen-activated protein kinase 8
  – mitogen-activated protein kinase 9
  – mitogen-activated protein kinase 10
  – p38 mitogen-activated protein kinases
  – oncogene protein v-akt
  – phytochrome a
  – proline-directed protein kinases
  – cyclin-dependent kinases
  – cdc2-cdc28 kinases
  – cyclin-dependent kinase 5
  – cyclin-dependent kinase 2
  – cyclin-dependent kinase 4
  – cyclin-dependent kinase 6
  – glycogen synthase kinase 3
  – mitogen-activated protein kinases
  – extracellular signal-regulated map kinases
  – mitogen-activated protein kinase 1
  – mitogen-activated protein kinase 3
  – mitogen-activated protein kinase 6
  – mitogen-activated protein kinase 7
  – jnk mitogen-activated protein kinases
  – mitogen-activated protein kinase 8
  – mitogen-activated protein kinase 9
  – mitogen-activated protein kinase 10
  – p38 mitogen-activated protein kinases
  – protein kinase c
  – protein kinase c-alpha
  – protein kinase c-delta
  – protein kinase c-epsilon
  – proto-oncogene proteins c-akt
  – proto-oncogene proteins c-bcr
  – proto-oncogene proteins c-pim-1
  – rhodopsin kinase
  – ribosomal protein s6 kinases
  – ribosomal protein s6 kinases, 70-kda
  – ribosomal protein s6 kinases, 90-kda
  – protein-tyrosine kinase
  – focal adhesion protein-tyrosine kinases
  – focal adhesion kinase 1
  – focal adhesion kinase 2
  – mitogen-activated protein kinase kinases
  – map kinase kinase 1
  – map kinase kinase 2
  – map kinase kinase 3
  – map kinase kinase 4
  – map kinase kinase 5
  – map kinase kinase 6
  – map kinase kinase 7
  – proto-oncogene proteins c-fes
  – receptor protein-tyrosine kinases
  – fms-like tyrosine kinase 3
  – receptor, fibroblast growth factor, type 1
  – receptor, fibroblast growth factor, type 2
  – receptor, fibroblast growth factor, type 3
  – receptor, fibroblast growth factor, type 4
  – proto-oncogene proteins c-kit
  – proto-oncogene proteins c-met
  – proto-oncogene proteins c-ret
  – receptor, epidermal growth factor
  – receptor, erbb-2
  – receptor, erbb-3
  – receptor, igf type 1
  – receptor, insulin
  – receptor, macrophage colony-stimulating factor
  – receptor, trka
  – receptor, trkb
  – receptor, trkc
  – receptors, eph family
  – receptor, epha1
  – receptor, epha2
  – receptor, epha3
  – receptor, epha4
  – receptor, epha5
  – receptor, epha6
  – receptor, epha7
  – receptor, epha8
  – receptor, ephb1
  – receptor, ephb2
  – receptor, ephb3
  – receptor, ephb4
  – receptor, ephb5
  – receptors, platelet-derived growth factor
  – receptor, platelet-derived growth factor alpha
  – receptor, platelet-derived growth factor beta
  – receptors, tie
  – receptor, tie-1
  – receptor, tie-2
  – receptors, vascular endothelial growth factor
  – vascular endothelial growth factor receptor-1
  – vascular endothelial growth factor receptor 2
  – vascular endothelial growth factor receptor-3
  – proto-oncogene proteins c-abl
  – src-family kinases
  – lymphocyte specific protein tyrosine kinase p56(lck)
  – oncogene protein pp60(v-src)
  – proto-oncogene proteins c-fyn
  – proto-oncogene proteins c-hck
  – proto-oncogene proteins c-yes
  – proto-oncogene proteins pp60(c-src)
  – zap-70 protein-tyrosine kinase
  – pyridoxal kinase
  – pyruvate kinase
  – thymidine kinase
  – uridine kinase
  – phosphotransferases (carboxyl group acceptor)
  – acetate kinase
  – aspartate kinase
  – aspartokinase homoserine dehydrogenase
  – phosphoglycerate kinase
  – phosphotransferases (nitrogenous group acceptor)
  – arginine kinase
  – creatine kinase
  – creatine kinase, bb form
  – creatine kinase, mb form
  – creatine kinase, mitochondrial form
  – creatine kinase, mm form
  – phosphotransferases (paired acceptors)
  – pyruvate, orthophosphate dikinase
  – phosphotransferases (phosphate group acceptor)
  – adenylate kinase
  – atp synthetase complexes
  – proton-translocating atpases
  – bacterial proton-translocating atpases
  – chloroplast proton-translocating atpases
  – mitochondrial proton-translocating atpases
  – vacuolar proton-translocating atpases
  – guanylate kinase
  – nucleoside-diphosphate kinase
  – nucleoside-phosphate kinase
  – transferases (other substituted phosphate groups)
  – CDP-diacylglycerol—inositol 3-phosphatidyltransferase
  – CDP-diacylglycerol—serine O-phosphatidyltransferase
  – diacylglycerol cholinephosphotransferase
  – ethanolaminephosphotransferase

– sulfur group transferases (EC 2.8)
  – coenzyme a-transferases
  – sulfotransferases
  – aryl sulfotransferase
  – sulfurtransferases
  – thiosulfate sulfurtransferase

The list continues at List of MeSH codes (D09).

D08